Weddicar is a civil parish in Copeland, Cumbria, England. At the 2011 census it had a population of 451.

It lies east of Whitehaven and west of Cleator Moor; the main settlement is the hamlet of Keekle. The northwestern boundary of the parish follows the River Keekle. The B 5295 road from Whitehaven to Cleator Moor crosses the parish, as did the Cleator and Workington Junction Railway (closed 1992, now dismantled although Keekle Viaduct remains).

There is a parish council, the lowest level of local government.

Listed buildings

There are two listed buildings in the parish: Nether End Farmhouse at grade II* and another farmhouse at grade II.

References

External links
 Cumbria County History Trust: Weddicar (nb: provisional research only – see Talk page)

Civil parishes in Cumbria
Borough of Copeland